Haridatta II ( 1638) was an astronomer from Mewar (present day Rajasthan) who is known for one of the first astronomical tables from India known as the Jagadbhūṣaṇa published in 1638. 

Haridatta, the son of Haraji, lived during the reign of Jagatsiṃha I (1628–1652) of Mewar. Little is known of him other than the one published set of tables for identifying planetary positions following the Brahmapaksha school of astronomy. It has been said that the earlier genre of algorithms coded in verse for the computation of planetary positions was replaced by the table-text format with this publication.

References 

Indian astronomers